Francis Lynch  Frank Lynch or Francis J. Lynch,  Democratic member of the Pennsylvania State Senate from Philadelphia.

Francis Lynch is also the name of:
 Francis Lynch, a.k.a. Sir Francis Lynch-Blosse, 9th Baronet (1801–1840) of the Lynch Baronets, in Ireland
 Frank J. Lynch a.k.a. Francis Lynch (1922–1987), Republican member of the Pennsylvania House of Representatives from Delaware County, Pennsylvania
Francis Charles Lynch-Staunton (1905–1990), 11th Lieutenant Governor of Alberta
 a fictional military police colonel

See also
Frank Lynch (disambiguation)

Fran Lynch (1945–2014), American football player
Frances Lynch, historian, see Reader's Digest Condensed Books